Diriangén Femenino Fútbol Club is a women's football club based in Diriamba, Nicaragua.

History 

In 2021, Diriangén FC were relegated to the second-tier Liga Segunda Femenina.

Honours

Domestic competitions

League titles 
 Nicaraguan women's football championship
 Winners (4): 2000, 2001, 2003, 2010

References

External links
  

Football clubs in Nicaragua
Association football clubs established in 1990
1990 establishments in Nicaragua